Caliber Collection (formerly Jewelry for a Cause) is an online company that was founded by Jessica Pollack Mindich, an American jewelry designer, in December 2008.

History
In 2000, Mindich stepped down from her position as General Counsel at an internet company to raise a family. With both her children in school years later, Mindich found herself desperate to get back to work. She started looking for a job based on the notion of being able to do something important to her, a lesson learned from her philanthropic parents. In 2008, she launched Jewelry for a Cause, with the idea of making and selling jewelry to raise money for both foreign and domestic causes.

Jewelry for a Cause became popular with public and private schools, offering an alternative to the standard school rings and sweatshirts, while also offering an additional fundraising tool next to candy bars and wrapping paper. Mindich's organization has raised money for more than 300 schools and charities.

Mindich attended a conference in December 2011, where the Mayor of Newark (NJ) Cory Booker, was discussing the illegal gun violence affecting his city. Mindich spoke with Mr. Booker, who had attended Yale Law School with Mindich's husband, about Newark's gun buyback program. Together, they drew a connection to her work designing jewelry as a fundraising tool and the partnership began between the city and police department of Newark and Jewelry for a Cause. In 2012, Mindich launched the Caliber Collection jewelry line two weeks before the Sandy Hook Elementary School shooting in Newtown, CT.

Starting with melting metals from guns that had been confiscated in old cases, the bracelets are stamped with a serial number that corresponds with one of the guns taken off the streets by the Newark Police Department. The bracelet shape is oval, representing the trigger cage of a gun. 20% of the proceeds from each purchase fund a Gun buyback program in the future.

In 2015, Mindich rebranded Jewelry for a Cause to the Caliber Collection.

Gun Buyback

Newark 
The weekend of April 27, 2013, the city of Newark, NJ the Newark Police Department and Jewelry for a Cause hosted a gun buyback. Police recovered 210 weapons, including eight assault rifles. The weekend event was fully funded by Mindich's company by providing $60,000, from the sales of the Caliber Collection bracelets, in total to the cause.

San Francisco 
Captain Michael Perry, of the Pittsburg Police Department in California, shipped Mindich disabled guns from the department's buyback program in 2013 to create the Caliber San Francisco jewelry line. A privately funded buyback had collected 291 weapons, including assault rifles, handguns, shotguns and rifles. "San Francisco" is stamped on the inside of the bracelet to represent the Bay area as a whole. A portion of the sales goes towards future gun buybacks in Pittsburg, California.

Other Products

Talismans
The Talisman necklace line from the web-based company includes a charm featuring a Buddha, peace sign and daisy to name a few, where part of the sales are given to online charity www.donorschoose.org. Other items from this line donate to many other organizations, including the American Heart Association and the American Red Cross Japanese earthquake and Pacific tsunami disaster relief efforts.

In Gratitude 
The In Gratitude necklace line is made from recycled newspaper, barkcloth and natural plant dye by local artisans in Uganda. The purchase of any necklace from this line helps the women of Uganda create a sustainable source of income for their families and community.

References

External links
Caliber Collection has closed due to Covid-19
 Jewelry for a Cause blog

Jewelry companies of the United States